Hubert Chinner (30 August 1870 – 12 June 1953) was an Australian cricketer. He played three first-class matches for South Australia between 1898 and 1900.

See also
 List of South Australian representative cricketers

References

External links
 

1870 births
1953 deaths
Australian cricketers
South Australia cricketers
Cricketers from Adelaide